Virtualmin is a domain hosting and website control panel which gives the ability to create and manage many domains, as well as simplify both automation and tasks. It is based on Webmin. Virtualmin is an alternative to cPanel and Plesk.

General description 
Virtualmin is available in two versions. Virtualmin GPL and Virtualmin Professional. The Virtualmin GPL version is fully free and open-source software and does not require monthly fee, compared to the Virtualmin Professional version which requires a monthly or annual fee.

Both Virtualmin versions are able to create virtual servers with fully independent users, mailboxes, web application development environments, websites, web applications, quotas, account rules, and instances of web server, database server, and create other needed software. Supported web servers include, but are not limited to, Apache or httpd.

See also

 Domain Technologie Control
 Webmin

References

External links
 

Unix configuration utilities